Denisa Tîlvescu (born 13 August 1996) is a Romanian rower. She was part of the team that won the gold medal in the women's eight competition at the 2017 World Rowing Championships in Sarasota, Florida.

References

External links
 

1996 births
Living people
Romanian female rowers
World Rowing Championships medalists for Romania
Rowers at the 2014 Summer Youth Olympics
Youth Olympic gold medalists for Romania
Rowers at the 2020 Summer Olympics
20th-century Romanian women
21st-century Romanian women